Donotknow is a Russian fairy tale (skazka) collected by folklorist Alexandr Afanasyev in his three-volume compilation Russian Fairy Tales. The tale was also translated as "Know Not" by Jack V. Haney.

Summary
A widowed rich merchant has a son, Ivan, and marries a new wife. When he is ready to go on a business trip, Ivan asks his father to find him his "luck". The merchant finds a scabby foal, and buys it. He brings it home and gives it to Ivan, who takes care of the horse and works at his father's counter.

Meanwhile, Ivan's stepmother begins to hate her stepson, and plots with "a wise old woman" to kill him: first, she puts poison under the house threshold. Ivan leaves his father's shop and goes home, but enters the stables to check on the foal and finds him crying. He questions the animal the reason why and the foal, in tears, tells Ivan that his stepmother has placed poison under the threshold, and he should let his dog enter the house first. Ivan follows the horse's warnings: the dog crosses the threshold and "it [is] torn into small atoms" (in Leonard Magnus's translation).

The stepmother's second attempt involves giving Ivan a cup of poisoned wine. Once again, the foal cries in the stables and warns Ivan of the next attempt. The boy simply throws the liquid out of the window. On her third attempt, the stepmother gives Ivan a shirt that will strangle him. With the horse's warnings, Ivan gives the shirt to a servant to wear, and he falls to the ground as if he is dead. Ivan takes off the shirt from the boy and throws it in the oven; the boy servant returns to life and the oven breaks apart in small pieces.

Failing all attempts to kill her stepson, the woman turns her attentions to the foal. After her husband returns from the journey, she pretends to be ill and tells her husband she had a dream that, if the foal's throat is slit and its liver rubbed on her body, she may regain her health. Ivan's father tells him of his intentions: the foal is to be killed to restore his stepmother's health. Ivan cries over his father's decision and goes to the stables. The horse is aware of its planned fate, and begs Ivan to save it, just as it saved Ivan, by having the boy ask his father to take one last ride on it.

Ivan follows the horse's instructions and flees with the horse to another kingdom, leaving a goodbye letter to his father explaining his reasons to leave. At a safe distance, the foal tells Ivan to pluck three hairs of its mane to summon it, and advises him to kill a bull, dress in its hide, put a bladder on his head as a cap, and only repeat the words "Idonotknow". The horse then vanishes. Ivan sails with a crew and only repeats "Idonotknow" to the sailor. Finally, Ivan reaches a kingdom, where the king hires him as a scarecrow for his gardens.

The king has three daughters, the third the most beautiful of the lot. A foreign Arab prince tells her father he wants her, either by choice or by force, but the king refuses to surrender her to the Arab prince and he moves his armies to invade the kingdom. Ivan learns of this and summons his loyal horse by burning one of its hairs. The horse appears at once, and takes Ivan to the battlefield. Ivan vanquishes several soldiers, steals a helmet to conceal his face, and leaves only the Arab prince and a few soldiers alive, then goes back to the gardener, dismisses the horse, and resumes his menial work.

Some time later, the Arab prince sends another letter asking for the king's third princess, and is still denied, so he prepares another attack. Ivan Donotknow ditches his shabby disguise, summons the horse and rides again to battle, where he fights every Arab knight, leaving some alive to tell the tale. Ivan, however, is injured in his hand by one of the Arab soldiers, and the princess, seeing his wound, takes a kerchief and wraps it around Ivan's hand.

Time passes, and the king decides to marry his two elder daughters to famous Tsarevichi. During the celebrations, the guests take notice of Donotknow as he works in the garden, and inquire about his presence there. The king explains that the man at garden is Donotknow and works as a scarecrow. However, the third princess recognizes her kerchief wrapped around his hand. After a while, she begins to visit the garden to be next to him, and eventually asks her father to wed them both. The king then marries his daughter to Donotknow.

Finally, the Arab prince sends another letter asking for the princess, but the king writes him back that she is bethroted to Donotknow, and invites him to come see it for himself. The Arab prince comes and, seeing the strange man Donotknow, summons him to a mortal combat. Ivan Donotknow once again shirks his shabby disguise, summons the horse and rides into the open field to fight the Arab prince. After a long fight, Ivan kills the Arab prince, and his father-in-law, the king, recognizes Ivan not as the lowly gardener, but as a brave knight. Ivan marries the princess, brings his merchant father to live with him, and punishes his traitorous stepmother.

Analysis

Tale type 
The tale is classified - and gives its name - to the East Slavic type SUS 532, of the East Slavic Folktale Classification: a hero is banished with his horse by his stepmother and, to protect himself, he is advised by the horse to always say "не знаю" (Russian for "I do not know"); the hero finds work as a gardener to another king, and, through heroic deeds, marries a princess.

The East Slavic type corresponds, in the international Aarne-Thompson Index (henceforth, AaTh), as tale type AaTh 532, "I Don't Know (The Helpful Horse)". However, folklorist Stith Thompson, in his work The Folktale, doubted the existence of the story as an independent tale type, since, barring a different introduction, its main narrative becomes "the same as in the Goldener tale [tale type 314]". This prompted him to suppose the tale type was a "variety" of "Goldener".

A similar notion is shared by Greek folklorists Anna Angelopoulou, Marianthi Kapanoglou and Emmanuela Katrinaki, editors of the Greek Folktale Catalogue: although they classified the Greek variants under type 532, they still recognized that they should be indexed as type 314, since their only difference seems to lie in the introductory episodes. The Hungarian Folktale Catalogue (MNK) also took notice of the great similarity between types 532 and 314, which difficulted a specific classification into one or the other.

Furthermore, German folklorist Hans-Jörg Uther, in his 2004 revision of the international tale type index (henceforth, ATU), subsumed type AaTh 532 under a new tale type, ATU 314, "Goldener", due to "its similar structure and content".

Motifs 
Professor Anna Birgitta Rooth stated that the motif of the stepmother's persecution of the hero appears in tale type 314 in variants from Slavonic, Eastern European and Near Eastern regions. She also connected this motif to part of the Cinderella cycle, in a variation involving a male hero and his cow.

Distribution 
Stith Thompson supposed that this tale type was "essentially a Russian development", with variants also found in Hungary, Finland and the Baltic Countries. In the same vein, Hungarian-American scholar Linda Dégh stated that the type was "particularly widespread" in the Central and Eastern regions of Europe.

Variants

Europe

Russia

Predecessors 

One of the oldest attestations of the tale type in Russia is the tale "Сказка о тридесяти трёх летнем сидне Иване-крестьянском сыне" ("Fairy Tale about 33-years-old Ivan, the Peasant's Son"), dated to 1788. In this tale, the titular Ivan, the Peasant's Son, is the son of a peasant couple, but suffers from not moving his legs for years, until he is 33 years old. At this age, a old beggar man pays a visit to Ivan's parents' house and somehow cures Ivan. His parents celebrate, but Ivan wants to travel the world. In his wanderings, he goes to another kingdom, where, at the request of the king, stops "a great noise". In return, Ivan summons a retinue of workers and they excavate a spot on the ground: they find a large vault with a large iron door with a copper ring. Inside, Ivan finds a horse and armor. The horse can talk and tells Ivan it was hidden in the vault by hero Lukoper, but it has been waiting for Ivan as its new rider. Ivan takes the horse with him and rides to "Китайское" (Russian language: "China"), where he places a cap on his head and only answers "Не знаю" ("I don't know"). He finds work as the Chinese emperor's gardener, and draws the attention - and love - of the youngest princess. Some time later, the emperor asks his three daughters to be married: the elder two, Dauzo and Siaoyu, choose noble princes, while the youngest, Lotaoyu (Loatoa, in another spelling), wants to marry the gardener. Despite the emperor's protests, she is adamant in her choice, and their father sends messages to their potential husbands. However, a spurred prince named Polkan decides to attack the kingdom to take princess Loatoa by force. Ivan, the Peasant's Son, summons his horse (called "Sivko-Burko" in the story), and fights the enemy army three times as a mysterious knight. After the third time, Loatoa notices the knight's injured hand and bandages it. Ivan, the Peasant's Son, returns to the gardener's hut and, exhausted due to the war, lies in bed for three days. His wife, princess Loatoa, enters his hut and recognizes the handkerchief on him.

As part of his work A Russian garland of Fairy Tales, medievalist Robert Steele translated the tale as Story of Ivan, the Peasant's Son, wherein the Chinese emperor is named Chinese Tsar, and the princesses Duasa, Skao and Lotao. In the preface to his book, Steele stated that the work contained translations of Russian "peasant Chap-books" from the first half of the 19th century. Sinologist  suggested that the names of the princesses and the setting of this tale (China) may indicate that the story was adapted from an Eastern source, either from Central Asia or the Middle East.

Regional tales 
In a Russian tale translated as Ivan Kruchina, Kruchina is an old merchant, and Ivan (or Ivanushka) is his young son. One day, he marries a young woman, and goes away on business. While Kruchina is away, his second wife begins to receive "visitors", which she explains to her step-son are her relations. Ivan says he will tell his father when he comes back, and his stepmother, warned by a servant, tries to kill him: first, by giving him poisoned wine; next, by giving him a poisoned cake. Ivan is warned of the danger by a talking horse his father kept in the stables. The stepmother's servant reveals to her mistress the horse was guarding the boy, and tries to take it to drink a pail of poisoned water. Ivan arrives just in time to stop the deed. Failing all attempts, the stepmother feigns illness and tells her husband, recently returned, that she needs the horse's gall as cure. Kruchina makes preparations to kill the horse, but his son Ivan asks to feed it and ride it one last time. The horse drops Ivan and kicks him three times, increasing the boy's strength, and telling him to ask for a last ride. Kruchina indulges his son, and Ivan gallops away with the horse anywhere else. He meets an old lady on the road and lifts her cart. In thanks, the old lady, who is Death herself, kills him, which scares off his horse. A falcon flying overhead, which was carrying a vial of water of life and water of death, sees Ivan's dead body and flies down to revive him with the vials. Ivan is resurrected and told by the falcon his horse fled to a city surrounded by walls of crystal and marble. Ivan tries to enter the city, but is captured and taken to the city's king, who inquires Ivan about his identity. Ivan only answers "I don't know". The king supposes Ivan is putting up an act, but decides to hire him as keeper of the treasury. He is given the keys to the treasury, and opens a door; inside, the talking horse, chained to the a wall. The horse urges Ivan to release it, take a brush and a glove, and ride away from the city in a "Magical Flight" sequence: Ivan throws the objects to delay their pursuers (the glove creates a dense forest and the brush a mountain). Ivan reaches another kingdom, where he finds work as a czar's gardener. The czar's third princess, still unmarried, unlike her elder sisters, falls in love with the gardener and wraps her handkerchief around his finger when a thorn prickles his skin. Later, the kingdom is attacked by an enemy army, and Ivan rides into battle on the talking horse. After the second battle, the princess recognizes her handkerchief on the knight, who lifts his helmet to show the czar his face: Ivan, the gardener.

In a Romani-Russian tale collected by Yefim Druts and Alexei Gessler and translated by author James Riordan as The Enchanted Hinny, a wealthy gypsy man trades in horses. His wife dies and leaves him their young son. The gypsy man remarries, but his new wife hates her step-son so much she complains to her mother. Years later, the man is ready to go to a horse fair and his son asks him to bring him the first thing his eyes greet when he enters the town. The man agrees and goes to the fair, setting his eyes on a pint-sized hinny. He buys the animal and brings it to his son. The boy treats and grooms the hinny. The stepmother's hatred of the boy comes to a head and she conspires with her mother to kill him: first, she bakes some rolls laced with poison; next, she gives him a shirt that will burn him to cinders. With the hinny's warnings, the boy avoids the dangers: he gives the rolls to dogs and throws the shirt in the oven. After failing twice, she and her mother discover the hinny is helping the boy, and she asks her husband to get rid of the little animal, since it bites her hand. The hinny advises the boy to ask for one last ride on the animal, then they will make their way to the distant mountains. It happens so, and they reach another kingdom. The hinny advises the boy to buy a sheep's skin and wears it on himself, and to utter the words "know not how". The boy follows the hinny's orders and finds work as a cook for a king, and answers his questions "know not how" - which becomes his new appellation: "Know Not How". One time, Know Not How goes to gather firewood, and chops down the tsar's sturdy oak by himself. Some time later, the elder princess is to be delivered to a six-headed sea dragon, but the king sends Know Not How and three knights to protect her and defeat the beast. Know Not How kills the monster and is given a ring by the princess, but he insists the three knights are to be celebrated as the true heroes. The second princess is also given to a nine-headed sea dragon; Know Not How kills the dragon and is given the princess's necklace. Lastly, the youngest princess is given to a twelve-headed sea monster, but the three knights drug Know Not How with a sleeping potion, and he falls asleep. The monster comes and the princess sheds a tear that wakes Know Not How. The gypsy boy fights the multiheaded monster to a standstill, but his hinny comes all of a sudden and helps him vanquish the beast. He gathers the monster's heads and buries them in the sand along with those from the previous monsters, then sends the three knights and the princess back to the palace to celebrate. During the feast, however, the youngest princess asks her father to invite the gypsy cook. Despite his reservations, the king allows for the cook to come. At a certain point, the three knights boast about their "victory", when the youngest princess asks them to show the guests the monsters' decapitated heads. This leads to Know Not How revealing the truth, him marrying the youngest princess, and the three knights being banished.

Eastern Europe

Croatia 
In a Croatian language tale from Istria, collected by folklorist Maja Bošković-Stulli with the title Đovanin i konjić ("Dovanin and the Little Horse"), Dovanin is given a little horse. One day, while he in the stables, the horse cries and warns the boy that his aunt intends to kill him by giving him cookies laced with poison, and later poisoned tea. With the horse's warnings, he avoids both dangers, and they both flee from home. At a distance, the horse advises the boy to answer everything only with the sentence "ne znan" ("I don't know"), and gives him its bridle which can summon it in case the boy needs any help. Dovanin goes to a nearby city and looks for a job with the king. The king's daughter, seeing his beauty, convinces her father to hire him as their gardener. While he is at work, the youth summons the horse and tramples the entire royal garden. The king learns of this and threatens to kill him, but, once again, the princess intervenes on his behalf. Some time later, the king summons his daughters' potential husbands, Dovanin included, and asks the latter to wait behind a door, while the two elder princesses gift their husbands, two princes, a golden apple and a silken ribbon. The youngest princess also gives has golden apple and silk ribbon to Dovanin. Later, the king summons his three sons-in-law to hunt some fowl in the woods. Dovanin rides behind his brothers-in-law on a lame horse, but, when he is out of sight, he summons his loyal horse and hunts fowl all around the woods. Soon after, the two princes find him and the large set of game. Without recognizing him and their brother-in-law, they ask the stranger to share some of the game; Dovanin agrees to a trade: some of the fowl in exchange for their golden apples. The princes return to the castle, and Dovanin not far behind, but with the best fowl. Some time later, war breaks out, and the king orders his sons-in-law to fight for the kingdom. Dovanin is given another lame horse - and is expected to die in battle, but ditches the shabby mount and summons his horse again. He rides into battle and defeats the enemy army, but is injured in his right leg. The princes bandage his injury, and Dovanin retutns back to the lame ride, while the princes go directly to the castle for a celebratory feast. The two princes claim that Dovanin died in battle, but he soon enters the feast.

Czech Republic 
Author Bozena Nemcova wrote down a version named Prince Bayaya, which Parker Fillmore commented that it is "a mosaic of two or three simpler stories". In the story, twin princes are born to a king and queen. The king asks the queen for his favourite son to inherit the throne. Owing to that, the other brother journeys on his own, in the company of his faithful horse. The horse speaks to him and recommends his prince disguises himself as a peasant with a speech impediment (he should only respond with "I don't know" when asked).

Hungary 
The Hungarian Folktale Catalogue (MNK) registers type AaTh 532 as Nemtudomka: the hero escapes with his horse to another kingdom and is advised to always answer "Nem tudom" (Hungarian for "I don't know").

The king presents Dániel with the foal, and they become friends. One day, however, one of the king's generals becomes the queen's lover, and they plan to kill the prince since he is too clever and may reveal their affair. First, they place a dagger in his bed, so it can pierce his heart in his sleep; next, the queen bakes him sweets laced with poison. With the horse's warnings, Dániel avoids both attempts. The general notices the horse is the one helping the prince, and tells the queen to feign illness and ask for the foal's liver as cure after the king comes home from war. When the king returns, the queen asks for the foal's liver, and the king tells Dániel they will kill his pet foal. The prince then asks his father to saddle his horse so he can run circles around the castle for three laps, then toast to their health. The king indulges his son one last time; Dániel makes a toast to the king, the queen, and the treasonous general, then rides away to London, England, while the king deals with the traitorous queen and her paramour. Back to Dániel, the horse advises him to always answer "Nem tudom". Dániel goes to find work in the castle, and is hired as a cook's assistant. However, he is a disaster at the kitchen, and is given to the royal gardener as his asistant. One day, the people go to church, and Dániel, in his new identity of Nemtudomka, goes to meet his horse, which gives him a bridle to summon him. The next Sunday, everyone at the castle goes to mass, save for the princess, who stays at the castle. Thinking no one is at the castle, Nemtudomka summons his horse, which furnishes him with copper-coloured garments so he can ride the horse around the garden and trmple the flowers - an event witnessed by the youngest princess. After the royal family and the staff return from church, the gardener complains to Nemtudomka and threatens to beat him to discipline him, but the princess intervenes on the latter's behalf. This repeats again for the next two Sundays, with Nemtudomka in silver and golden garments. Some time later, the king decides to marry his three daughters: the elder two choose princes and the youngest Nemtudomka, and they move out to a shabby hut just outside the palace. Later, Nemtudomka's brothers-in-law go on a hunt and invite Nemtudomka to join them. Although he is given a lame horse at first, he dismisses the mount and summons his loyal horse to run ahead of his brothers-in-law: in the first hunt, he agrees to share the golden mallard in exchange for their rings; in the second hunt, he agrees to give them he golden deer if they allow to be branded on their foreheads with a signet ring; in the third hunt, he agrees to share with them the golden game, if they allow to be branded with a gallows on their backs. Later, Nemtudomka's horse gives him three magical bags (one full of unlimited ammo, another with infinite food and the third able to summon an army), since his father-in-law's kingdom will soon enter a war against Kukoricza Marczi. Nemtudomka and his brothers-in-law are called to defend the kingdom, but only Nemtudomka, wearing his royal garments, turns the tide of battle, but is injured in the leg during a fight. The king, his father-in-law, sees the knight's injury and bandages with his scarf, then the knight retreats to parts unknows. At the end of the tale, the king summons the kingdom for a feast at the castle, where Nemtudomka unmasks the boastful brothers-in-law due to their rings and marks on their bodies, and tells the king he is prince Dániel. The tale was translated into German as Weissnitle by Gottlieb Stier.

While the king goes to war, she gives birth to a golden-haired boy and the mare foals a golden-maned colt. The boy and the colt become great friends growing up. However, the queen herself begins to hate her own child and conspires with a tailor ways to kill him: first, she tries to give the prince a bowl of poisoned soup; next, she bakes bread with poison and tries to have him eat it; lastly, the tailor sews a garment that could kill the prince immediately. With the colt's warnings, the prince avoids the danger. Finally, his father, the king, returns home, and the colt tells the prince they have nothing more to keep them at home, and prepare to escape. The colt takes the boy to another kingdom, tells him to find work and always utter the words "Nem tudom" ("I don't know"), and gives him its bridle to summon it. The prince knocks on the castle doors, and its occupants ask the motive of his visit, but since he always says "Nem tudom", they cannot understand him. Even the king's three daughters ask him, the youngest the most empathetic towards him. She inquires him if he wants to be their gardener; he nods with the head and is hired as the royal gardener. Under him, the garden flourishes, to the youngest princess's delight. Some time later, on a Sunday, the king and his daughters go to church, and leave the youngest princess at the castle. While they are away, Nemtudomka summons his horse and asks it to provide him with silver clothes so he can ride around the garden - an event witnessed by the princess. This happens again in the next two Sundays, with Nemtudomka in golden clothes and diamond garments. Later, the elder princesses are already married to princes, but the youngest, stil unmarried, makes up a suitor test: whoever catches from her hand her scarf, her ring and a golden apple, shall marry her. Nemtudomka rides the horse in his diamond clothes, gets the items and runs back to his hut. The king discovers him and marries the boy to his youngest daughter, and has them move out to a henhouse. Some time later, Nemtudonka's brothers-in-law invite him to join them in the hunt, and give them a lame mount. As soon as his brothers-in-law are away, Nemtudomka summons his loyal horse and goes hunting for rabbits in the forest. The brothers-in-law are unable to hunt anything, and find Nemtudomka - whom they do not recognize -, and ask him if they can have some of his game. Nemtudomka agrees, as long as they agree to receive a stamp on their foreheads. During a second hunt, Nemtudomka catches red deer and agrees to share the carcass with his brothers-in-law, as long as they agree to be branded on their hands. Finally, the king summons his three sons-in-law to a feast. After the brothers-in-law boast about their hunting prowess, Nemtudonka points to their gloved hands and scarved foreheads as proof of their trickery, and tells the king the whole truth.

Georgia 
East Slavic tale type 532 is reported in the Georgian Folktale Index, numbered 532, "I Don't Know": the hero is banished from home, but, with the help of a horse, arrives at another kingdom, where he finds work as the king's gardener and only answers "I don't know".

Baltic region

Finland 
Tale type 532 is known in Finland as En tiedä ("I Don't Know""), according to the Finnish Folktale Catalogue, established by scholar Pirkko-Liisa Rausmaa: the hero's stepmother wants to kill him, but he escapes with the help of a horse; he becomes a gardener to another king and always utters the expression "En tiedä" ("I don't know").

In a Finnish tale titled Das kluge Pferde ("The Clever Horse"), a king dies. His son, the prince, has a talking horse he inherited from his father. One day, the horse warns the prince that his brother's widow is trying to kill him: first, by poisoning an egg and his food, then lacing his clothes with poison. With the horse's warning, the prince avoid the danger, until the horse advises them to take some clothes and flee to another kingdom. They do. When they reach another kingdom, the horse advises the prince to trade his fine garments for shabby ones, buy a pig's bladder and wear it as a cap, and always utter the words "miesnai, miesnai". The prince follows his words, and goes to the king's castle, where he shouts "miesnai", so the people think he is a dumb person. The king decides to hire him as a pig-keeper, which he excels at. Some time later, the king announces that his daughter shall marry the one who can hunt him a golden-feathered black grouse, a golden-feathered hazel grouse, and a golden-furred squirrel. The prince joins in the hunt by ditching his pig-keeper disguise, and summons the horse to hunt the golden animals. The princess's other suitor finds him in the forest and asks if he can sell him the animals. The prince - whom the suitor does not recognize as the pig-keeper - agrees to sell him, in exchange for his little fingers. The suitor takes the animals to the princess and the wedding date is set. The princess visits the pig-keeper and questions him about his origins. The pig-keeper tells her everything and how he found the golden animals. The princess then convinces him to be her true husband. During the wedding, the prince comes with his horse and proves the suitor's deception by showing the little fingers. He then marries the princess.

Estonia 
The Estonian Folktale Catalogue registers the episode of the treacherous stepmother and the hero's flight on the horse as the second introduction of tale type ATU 314, Hobune abiliseks ("The Horse as a Helper"): the hero escapes and finds work in another kingdom (as gardener or cook), and, depending on the variant, may always utter the word "nesnaaju" ('I don't know').

Lithuania 
According to professor , the Lithuanian Folktale Catalogue registers a similar type, indexed as AT 532, Arklys padėjėjas ("Horse Helper"): a boy and a foal are born at the same time due to their mothers eating either an apple or an egg, or a boy asks his father to buy him a horse; later, the boy's stepmother tries to poison him, but the horse warns him of the dangers and they both flee home to another kingdom; the boy finds work as a king's gardener and only utters the word "Nežinau" ("I don't know"). Most of the Lithuanian variants combine type AT 532 with type ATU 300, "The Dragon-Slayer".

Southern Europe 
In a tale from Mentone with the title The Little Mare, a widowed peasant has a mare he asks his son to take care of. He also remarries, and his new wife hates her step-son she plans to kill him: first by giving him some fritters laced with poison, then a cake. The boy's little mare warns the boy on both attempts, and is seen by the stepmother. She then plots with her doctor to feign illness and ask to be wrapped in the skin of a mare as her cure. The peasant's son escapes with the mare to another city, and the animal advises him to hide his golden hair under a kerchief and always utter the words "Bismé" to anything the people say. Bismé, as how he begins to be called, finds work as the royal gardener's assistant, and fashions beautiful bouquets for the king's three daughters, the youngest gaining the most exquisite of them. Later, the mare advises Bismé to take off the kerchief at midnight near the youngest princess's window, so she can see his bright golden hair shining in the distance. It happens thus, and the youngest princess falls in love with the gardener Bismé. She longs for him, and chooses him as her husband. The king agrees to their union, but banishes her from the castle to live a poor gardener's life, unlike her sisters, who married princes. Later, war breaks out, and the king's sons-in-law join in the fray, the two princes in fine horses and Bismé on a lame mule. When he is out of sight, the little mare appears before Bismé and they ride to battle, defeat the enemy army and take the banners of war with them. Next, the two princes go on a hunt fo catch some game, and meet Bismé in fine clothes, but do not recognize him. They ask for some game, and Bismé agrees, as long as they give him their wedding rings. The next day, the princes ask again for more game, and Bismé agrees, as long as they allow to be branded on their rumps. Finally, the king prepares a grand feast to celebrate the kingdom's victory, and the two princes boast about their prowess in war and in the hunt. Bismé then talks about how he got the banners of war, and the price he asked of his brothers-in-law for the game. The king banishes the two princes from the kingdom and names Bismé his heir.

Greece 
Greek scholar Marianthi Kaplanoglou states that the tale type AaTh 532, "I Don't Know" ("Bilmem", according to the national Greek Folktale Catalogue), is an "example" of "widely known stories (...) in the repertoires of Greek refugees from Asia Minor". According to Richard MacGillivray Dawkins, the hero's name "Bilmem" ("O Bilimes" and variations thereof) derives from the Turkish bilmem, meaning 'I do not know'.

Bulgaria 
Tale type AaTh 532 is reported in the Bulgarian Folktale Catalogue with the name "Чудесният кон (Незнаян)" or "Das Zauberpferd (Neznajan)" ("The Magic Horse"): the hero's stepmother tries to kill him, but the hero's horse warns him against her attempts, so she feigns illness and asks for the horse's heart (or the hero's blood); the hero escapes to another kingdom, where he finds work as a king's gardener, the king's daughters choose their husbands, and the youngest chooses the gardener; later, the hero summons his horse by burning its hairs and fights the king's enemies and fetches him a remedy.

Albania 
Slavicist , in his study on Balkan folklore, collected an Albanian language tale he translated as Le Poulain-Magique ("The Magic Colt"), from a teller named Poliksena Kuneškova. In this tale, a king and a queen have a son. Soon after, the queen dies and the king remarries, but his new wife hates her step-son and plans to kill him: first, by mixing poison in his food; next, putting poison on the stairs. The prince is warned of the attempts on his life by his friend, the colt. Later, the stepmother feigns illness and asks for the heart of a magic colt as a cure. The horse tells the prince of his stepmother's plan: she will have the horse killed first, then the boy himself, but they can escape; the boy is to ask his father for a silver armour, a sack of money, and for one last ride on the animal before it is executed. Their plan works without a hitch, and the prince flees on the horse away from his kingdom. They reach the outskirts of a city; the horse says it will keep the money they brought with them, and advises the prince to find a job, and gives him three hairs which can summon it. The prince enters the city, buys from a shepherd his clothes, and begins to wander the city shouting "bylmem!" ("Je ne sais", in Mazon's translation. English: "I don't know"). Some time later, the local king sets a suitor selection test for his three daughters: every available suitor shall pass by the palace door, and the princesses are to throw a golden apple to her husbands of choice. The two elder princesses throws theirs, but the youngest withholds hers until the shepherd passes by the castle and she throws him her golden apple. The king refuses to accept a lowly man as his son-in-law, but the princess insists on her choice, so the king marries them off and places them in a room at the back of the castle. Later, war breaks out with a neighbouring king, and the shepherd rides into battle on his horse and defeats the enemy army, taking the banners of war as proof of victory. The princess's father rejoices in their victory, but notices that the banners from the enemy army are missing. The youngest princess, following her husband's request, goes to her mother and pretends that her husband is gravelly ill, and begs her mother to accompany her to their room: the queen sees the shepherd in silver armour - the same armour the knight wore at the battlefield. The king recognizes the worth of his son-in-law and nominates him as his successor.

Bashkir people 
In a tale from the Bashkirs titled "Незнай" ("Don't-Know"), a merchant and his wife have a son. On the same day, a foal, a puppy and a kitten are born. Years later, when the merchant is away, the woman begins to have an affair with the boy's teacher from the madrashah, Khalfa. The man convinces her to get rid of the boy to keep the affair a secret: first, they try to poison his soup; next, they try to poison a piece of bread. However, the boy is warned of the danger by his horse. The khalfa then convinces the merchant's wife to feign illness and call for him. The khalfa, pretending to be a doctor, tells the merchant his wife needs meat from the horse and his son's thigh. Despite the cruelty of the remedy, the merchant decides to go through with it. The next day, the horse advises the boy to ask for one last ride on it. On the hour of execution, the boy does as the horse instructed, mounts on the horse and flees from home, the dog and cat behind them. After riding for a year, they stop to rest by a mountain, where the horse points to a stone nearby, and tells the merchant's son there is a sword and a mighty armor underneath it. The horse tells the boy to enter its ear and come out the other, and he will be able to lift the stone. After a while, the horse tels they must part, but the boy just has to whistle to summon him, and instructs him to always answer "Neznay" and play with a ball. The boy rolls a ball and arrives at the city, where the three princesses take notice of his beauty and fight over him, but he can only answer "Neznay". Some time later, the king sets his elder daughter's marriage, but a three-headed deva threatens to take the elder princess by force. The king gathers his troops to defend his daughter and fight against the three-headed deva's army. Neznay summons his horse, rides into the battlefield and kills the deva with the sword, then rushes back to his position. His elder daughter safe, he marries her to the vizier. The nest time, the king tries to marry his middle daughter to another vizier, but the six-headed deva threatens to take her. Just like the first time, Neznay summons the horse, rides into battle to defeat the deva, but is injured in the hand. The princess wraps a kerchief around his hand, and he gallops back to his place. The third time, the youngest princess chooses Neznay as her husband. Despite his reservations, the king consents to the marriage between simple Neznay and his daughter, but a twelve-headed deva threatens the kingdom. Neznay summons the horse and rides into battle to defeat the twelve-headed deva. After a fierce fight, he is victorious, but is conce again injured. The princess wraps his wound and returns to his hut to rest. The king's army goes back to the city and the princess looks for Neznay in the usual place, but does not find him, so she goes to his hut and finds him still wearing the armor. He wakes up and embraces her, and they marry. Some time later, his brothers-in-law try to get rid of Neznay by sending him on quests for outlandish items, such as a magic tablecloth guarded by an azhdaha. Neznay rides before them and shapeshifts into a fisherman. The brothers-in-law arrive later and the fisherman, asking him for the tablecloth. The fisherman (Neznay) promises to get them the tablecloth, in exchange for one brother-in-law cutting off a finger, and the other cutting off a slice of flesh from his back. With the help of his horse, Neznay gets the object and delivers it to his brothers-in-law, disguised as the fisherman, so they pay up the deal. The brothers-in-law then bring the tablecloth to the king and take the credit for the deed, but Neznay appears soon after and points to their attire: a glove hiding the missing finger, and a heavy shirt covering an injured back.

Chuvash people 
In a tale from the Chuvash people titled "ИВАН" ("Ivan"), an old couple have, in their old age, a son they name Ivan. Soon after, the mother dies and the old man remarries, fathering three girls with his second wife. Ivan's stepmother begins to hate her step-son and plots to kill him: first, by giving him cake laced with poison; next, she hangs an axe over the door to fall on Ivan when he comes in. With his friendly horse's advice, he survives both attempts, but sacrifices his dog to the second attempt. The stepmother consults with a healer on how to get rid of the boy, and she is advised to kill Ivan's horse. The horse warns Ivan about the stepmother's plan, and plots with Ivan to have the boy ask for one last ride on the animal, and both can seize the opportunity to flee. It happens thus. They escape to the wilderness; the horse advises Ivan to buy a pigskin from a shepherd and fashion a cap. Later, they ride to another city and stop by its gates; the horse tells Ivan to find work as gardener to the local king, and that he should but whistle and the horse will come in a flash. Ivan finds work with as the king's gardener, and only answers "Не могу знать" ("I cannot know"). Time passes. The king's daughters are being taken to be sacrificed to a dragon, and the monarch promises to marry them to whoever can save them. Hearing this, Ivan summons his faithful horse, rushes to the lake and kill the dragon to save the eldest daughter. The same happens to the middle daughter. False heroes try to get the credit for the deed and are set to marry the elder princesses. At last, Ivan and the horse save the third princess, and ride back to the hut. A third false hero claims to her saviour and is also set to marry her. During the wedding feast for the three princesses, the king orders his knights to bring Ivan to the feast, since the entire kingdom is celebrating. Ivan rides the horse again and, entering the royal court, takes off his cap and shows his golden hair. The youngest princess then recognizes Ivan as her true saviour; the false hero is punished, and Ivan marries the youngest princess.

Asia

Kazakhstan 
In a Kazakh tale translated into Russian as "Незнайка" ("I Don't Know"), a khan notices that his white mare is missing. His herdsman finds the mare on the lake shore next to a tulpar, and brings the animal home. Some time later, the mare gives birth to a foal, which the khan's son takes great interest in, knowing of the foal's parentage. Later, when the khan goes on a hunt, his wife, the khansha is approached by a lover and convinced to kill her own son. First, they try to poison his surpa dish; then, try to give him roasted meat laced with poison. The khan's son is warned against the danger by the horse. Knowing that the horse is helping him, the khansha's lover convinces her to feign illness and ask for meat of a tulpar - which just happens to be pedigree of the khan's son's pet horse. The horse tells the khan's son of his mother's plot, and says it will neigh three times the next day to alert the boy. It happens so: the next day, the khan's son stops the execution and asks for on last ride on the horse. He mounts it and gallops away from his homeland. At a safe distance, the boy takes a hair from his tulpar horse, doffs his fine garments and wears a shepherd's disguise. He then reaches a city gates, and, when inquired by the guards, always utters the words "ne znayu" ("I do not know") to anything people ask of him. He is brought to the king and keeps repeating the sentence to him, to great annoyance. The king orders his executio, but the viziers convince him to spare the stranger and employ him as the gardener. Neznaika - his new appellation - begins to work in the garden: he utters a magic word to raze the garden to the ground, then utters the same spell to plant beautiful trees. Later, the king's three daughters bring melons to their father as analogy to their marriagebility, so the king sets a suitor selection test: the princesses are to climb up a minaret and throw an apple to their husbands of choice among the jigits and other people. The elder two throw theirs, while the youngest withdraws hers until Neznaika is brought to the assemblage, and she finally throws hers. The king feels insulted by her choice and banishes his youngest daughter and Neznaika to a donkey pen. Later, the king orders his elder sons-in-law to hunt him some meat from a mountain goat. Neznaika joins in the hunt riding on a lame horse, but, when he is out of sight, he summons his tulpar horse, dons fine clothes and rides to the steppe and hunts a mountain goat. With the magic command, the boy curses the goat's meat to be bitter-tasting, but the entrails very sweet. The sons-in-law find him and ask him for the meat. Three days later, the sons-in-law hunt again; Neznaika rides before them and, uttering a magic word, materializes a cattle pen. Neznaika's brothers-in-law come to the cattle and ask him for some goat meat. Neznaika - which they don't recognize - agrees to give them some, in exchange for them having a "tamga" (a mark, a sign) on their backs. At the end of the tale, Neznaika appears to his father-in-law as the khan's son he is, and demands his two slaves, his brothers-in-law.

America 
Professor Alcée Fortier collected a Louisiana Creole tale titled Give Me: a woman, already married, does not have any child. One day, she sees an apple-seller with a basket of fruits on her head, and wishes to buy one. The apple-seller says she knows the woman wants to have a child, and gives her an apple. The woman eats the apple and discards the peels, which are eaten by a mare. The woman gives birth to a boy and the mare to a colt during the night. The woman gives the little horse to her son, since they were born at the same time, and they become great friends. Some time later, the boy wants to see the world, and rides away to another country where a king lives in a beautiful house. He dismounts his horse (which the story explains it is magical), wears beggar clothes and goes to the king's kitchen. He only utters the words "Give me" to anything the people say, and the king's servants think he is an idiot, but let him stay in the kitchen. On one Sunday, the king goes to church for mass, and leaves his daughter there. Thinking no one is at the castle, Give Me summons his magic horse and rides around the garden, trampling the flowers - an event witnessed by the princess, who falls in love with him. The king goes back home and, seeing the destroyed garden, asks Give Me if he saw anything. This happens on the following Sunday, until, on the third Sunday, the king decides to stay home to investigate the culprit: he sees Give Me on the horse galloping around the garden in princely clothes. The king questions Give Me, who tells about his lifestory and shows him the magic horse. The king then marries the youth to the princess.

See also 
 The Black Colt
 The Magician's Horse
 Little Johnny Sheep-Dung
 The Gifts of the Magician
 Făt-Frumos with the Golden Hair
 Iron Hans
 Fire Boy (Japanese folktale)

References 

fr:Neznaïko

Russian fairy tales
Horses in literature
Horses in culture
ATU 300-399
ATU 500-559